2006 Desafio Internacional das Estrelas was the second edition of Desafio Internacional das Estrelas (International Challenge of the Stars) held in two heats with Felipe Massa winning the first one and Antônio Pizzonia winning the second one. Overall winner was Felipe Massa.

Qualifying

Race 1 results

Race 2 results

1º) Antônio Pizzonia
2º) Nelsinho Piquet
3º) Lucas di Grassi
4º) Felipe Massa
5º) Tony Kanaan
6º) Vitantonio Liuzzi
7º) Enrique Bernoldi
8º) Rubens Barrichello

Final classification

2006
2006 in Brazilian motorsport